The British decimal twenty-five pence (25p) coin was a commemorative denomination of sterling coinage issued in four designs between 1972 and 1981. These coins were a post-decimalisation continuation of the traditional crown, with the same value of a quarter of a pound. Uniquely in British decimal coinage, the coins do not have their value stated on them. This is because previous crowns rarely did so. The British regular issue coin closest to the coin’s nominal value is the twenty pence coin.

The coins were issued for commemorative purposes and were not intended for circulation, although they remain legal tender and must be accepted at Post Offices. The coins weigh 28.28 g (0.9092 oz troy) and have a diameter of 38.61 mm.

Twenty-five pence coin issues were discontinued after 1981 due to the prohibitive cost to the Royal Mint of producing such large coins with such small value. From 1990 the "crown" was revived as the commemorative five pound coin, having the same dimensions and weight but a value twenty times as great.  The two can be distinguished because the five pound coin is marked with its value.

Designs

The following 25p coins were produced:

See also
Quarter sovereign – introduced in 2009, it has a nominal value of 25 pence

References

Twenty-Five Pence
Twenty-five-cent coins